Keepers of Memory is a 2004 documentary directed by Eric Kabera. It documents the eyewitness accounts and traumatic aftermath of the 1994 Rwandan genocide.

Synopsis 
In the documentary, features accounts of victims and perpetrators of the genocide. The documentary gets its name from its interview of people who take care of Rwanda's sacred burial sites to keep the memory of the genocide alive for future generations.

Screening 
It was screened at the 2004 Toronto International Film Festival. It was shown at the 5th Jewish Film Festival, Zagreb in 2011. 2020 Fribourg International Film Festival.

References 

2004 documentary films
Documentary films about the Rwandan genocide